The FIA World Cup for Cross-Country Bajas is a rally raid series organized by the FIA, culminating with a champion driver, co-driver, and team; with additional trophies awarded to T3 and T4 drivers & teams. 

Starting with the 2002 season, the previous FIA's International Cup for Cross-Country Bajas was joined with the FIA Cross-Country Rally World Cup to form the FIA World Cup for Cross-Country Rallies.
From the beginning of the 2019 season the cup was once again split, with the World Cup for Cross Country Bajas being held alongside the competition for "baja" style rally raids.

From the 2022 season, the competition runs alongside the World Rally-Raid Championship together with the FIM Bajas World Cup.

Champions

See also
Rally raid

References

External links
  official website
 
 Reports about the Series

 
Cross Country Rally World Cup
Cross Country Rally World Cup
Recurring sporting events established in 1993